Christopher John Sharpsten is a retired United States Army major general who most recently served as the Deputy Director of Supply, Production and Distribution for the United States Department of Defense COVID-19 prevention and treatment logistics program from July 2020 to July 2021. Previously, he served as the Director of Logistics of the United States Central Command from August 2018 to June 2020.

Sharpsten earned a Bachelor of Science degree in civil engineering from the United States Military Academy in 1988. He later received a Master of Business Administration degree in material and logistics management-operations from the Eli Broad Graduate School of Management at Michigan State University in 1997 and a Master of Science degree in national security strategy from the National War College in 2010.

Listed as Special Assistant to the Director of the Army Staff on the roster of Army general officers from 2020 to 2021, Sharpsten was in fact serving as deputy director of supply, production and distribution for the Department of Defense COVID-19 prevention and treatment logistics program led by General Gustave F. Perna.

References

Year of birth missing (living people)
Living people
Place of birth missing (living people)
United States Military Academy alumni
Eli Broad College of Business alumni
National War College alumni
Recipients of the Legion of Merit
United States Army generals
Recipients of the Defense Superior Service Medal
Recipients of the Distinguished Service Medal (US Army)